Chueca is a station on Line 5 of the Madrid Metro. It is located in Zone A. It serves Chueca square, famous for being a hotspot for LGBTQIA+ groups and culture.

References 

Line 5 (Madrid Metro) stations
Railway stations in Spain opened in 1970